Marshallese may refer to:
 Marshall Islands, a Micronesian island nation
 Marshallese language, a Malayo-Polynesian language of the Marshall Islands
 Marshallese people, the people of the Marshall Islands

See also 
 

Language and nationality disambiguation pages